The Arrow 3 or Hetz 3 is an exoatmospheric hypersonic anti-ballistic missile, jointly funded, developed and produced by Israel and the United States. Undertaken by Israel Aerospace Industries (IAI) and Boeing, it is overseen by the Israeli Ministry of Defense's "Homa" ("rampart") administration and the U.S. Missile Defense Agency. It provides exo-atmospheric interception of ballistic missiles (during the space-flight portion of their trajectory), including intercontinental ballistic missiles (ICBMs) carrying nuclear, chemical, biological or conventional warheads. With divert motor capability, its kill vehicle can switch directions dramatically, allowing it to pivot to see approaching satellites.

According to the chairman of the Israeli Space Agency, Arrow 3 may serve as an anti-satellite weapon, which would make Israel one of the world's few countries capable of shooting down satellites.

Background

In August 2008 the Israeli and United States governments began development of an upper-tier component to the Israeli Air Defense Command, known as Arrow 3, "with a kill ratio of around 99 percent". The development is based on an architecture definition study conducted in 2006–2007, determining the need for the upper-tier component to be integrated into Israel's ballistic missile defense system. According to Arieh Herzog, then Director of Israel Missile Defense Organization (IMDO), the main element of this upper tier will be an exoatmospheric interceptor, to be jointly developed by IAI and Boeing.

The new component will also require the integration of longer range detection, tracking and discrimination capability, beyond what the "Green Pine" and "Super Green Pine" radars employed with the Arrow 2 are providing. Among the advanced sensors considered for Israel's future multi-tier system, are airborne electro-optical sensors deployed on high flying unmanned aerial vehicles and future enhanced "Green Pine" radars, as well as the AN/TPY-2 radar already deployed in Israel, and operated by U.S. forces.

The multibillion-dollar development program of the Arrow is a joint development between Israel and the United States.

Development

IAI began preliminary tests of the Arrow 3 in 2011. The company will not specify what tests were performed, but they are part of the preparations for a full fly-out test. On January 23, 2012, the Israeli Ministry of Defense released photographs and video of the recent successfully fly-out tests from Palmachim Airbase. During the tests, a model of the interceptor missile was launched in order to check the starting and propulsion system, as well as other tracking sensors.

On January 23, 2012, IAI announced an agreement to jointly work on the Arrow 3 with Boeing. Boeing is responsible for 40–50 percent of the production content of the Arrow 3. Expected work content includes motorcases, shroud, canister, safe & arm / ignition devices, power devices (batteries), and inertial navigation units, as well as several avionics packages and actuators & valves.

On February 25, 2013, a fly-out test of the Arrow 3 was conducted from Palmachim Airbase. The launch tested the missile control and engines. It followed various objects, such as stars, and gained further altitude. Its engine stopped after six minutes.

On January 3, 2014, another successful test of the Arrow 3 was conducted from Palmachim Airbase. During the test the interceptor entered space and carried out a range of maneuvers in response to a virtual incoming enemy missile. The test involved the activation of two of the interceptor's engines, the first of which brought it into space, and the second allowing it to carry out complex maneuvers.

In December 2014 a test aimed to debut an exo-atmospheric intercept capabilities of Arrow 3 has been characterized as a "no test", given that "conditions did not allow for" actual launch of the intercepting missile.

On December 10, 2015, Arrow 3 scored its first intercept in a complex test designed to validate how the system can detect, identify, track and then discriminate real from decoy targets delivered into space by an improved Silver Sparrow target missile. According to officials, the milestone test paves the way toward low-rate initial production of the Arrow 3.

On February 19, 2018, Arrow 3 flight test took place in Israel.  Another test took place on January 22, 2019.

In a series of tests in July 2019 at the Pacific Spaceport Complex in Kodiak, Alaska, the Arrow 3 system successfully intercepted 3 "enemy" rockets, one of them outside the atmosphere. The tests demonstrated Arrow 3's ability to intercept exo-atmospheric targets.

Specifications

Israel Aerospace Industries announced in June 2009, that the Arrow 3 patented exoatmospheric interception method includes a two-stage interceptor, like the Arrow 2, but purely based on hit-to-kill technology. Unlike most kill vehicles, which use liquid or gas propulsion, the new Israeli kill vehicle will be propelled by an ordinary rocket motor equipped with a thrust-vectoring nozzle. It will also be fitted with a gimbaled seeker for hemispheric coverage. By measuring the seeker's line-of-sight propagation relative to the vehicle's motion, the kill vehicle will use proportional navigation to divert its course and line up exactly with the target's flight path. Joseph Hasson, chief missile designer at IAI, who patented the new kill vehicle with his colleague Galya Goldner, says that the concept is relatively simple, reliable and inexpensive, and is based on mature technologies. Furthermore, the kill vehicle's divert capability and agility reduce the need for detection and tracking systems, which usually accompany remote sensor-assisted exoatmospheric kills. IAI displayed a full-sized model of the Arrow 3 missile and its kill vehicle at the June 2009 Paris Air Show.

It could also be ship-based. Arrow 3 is faster than the Arrow 2 and slightly smaller, weighing nearly half.

An Arrow 3 battery is expected to intercept salvos of more than five ballistic missiles within 30 seconds. Arrow 3 can be launched into an area of space before it is known where the target missile is going. When the target and its course are identified, the Arrow interceptor is redirected using its thrust-vectoring nozzle to close the gap and conduct a "body-to-body" interception.

Arrow 3 may have a reduced 30-year life-cycle cost. It should use the same launch system as Arrow 2. Reportedly it will cost $2–3 million per unit, while program cost is estimated at some $700–$800 million over three years.

According to numerous Israeli experts, including Prof. Yitzhak Ben Yisrael, former director of the Israeli Administration for the Development of Weapons and Technological Infrastructure and currently the chairman of the Israeli Space Agency, it is also possible that the Arrow 3 could serve as an anti-satellite weapon.

Production
Stark, a U.S.-based subsidiary of Israel Aerospace Industries, was chosen to manufacture canisters for the Arrow 3, and made the first delivery in September 2018.

Deployment
According to Jane's Defence Weekly, a solicitation that outlines the expansion of an Israeli Air Force facility at Tal Shahar, roughly halfway between Jerusalem and Ashdod, near Beit Shemesh, indicates that almost certainly it will be used for four Arrow 3 launchers on sites cut into the surrounding hills. The estimated completion date would be around the end of 2014. Each of the four launchers will have six missiles for a total of 24 interceptors. The plans for the base were revealed in a routine United States Department of Defense contract solicitation. Arrow 3 was declared operational on January 18, 2017.

Exports 
  – was considering purchasing the system during the 2021 tensions with Iran
  – is considering purchasing the system to defend against Russian missiles. The sale was blocked by the United States, however.

See also

 RIM-161 Standard Missile 3
 S-300VM missile system
 S-400 missile system
 S-500 missile system
 HQ-19
 Terminal High Altitude Area Defense
 Indian Ballistic Missile Defence Programme

References

External links

 , dedicated to the Arrow system.
 .

Anti-ballistic missiles of Israel
Emergency management in Israel
IAI missiles
Missile defense
21st-century surface-to-air missiles
MLM products
Military equipment introduced in the 2010s
Israel–United States military relations